Bruce Duperouzel (born 21 April 1950) is a former Australian rules footballer and cricketer. Duperouzel started his football career with Claremont in the WANFL, and later played for St Kilda and Footscray in the VFL.

Duperouzel was born in Northam, Western Australia, and played 86 games as a rover at Claremont in five seasons, winning their 1971 fairest and best award. During the same period he represented WA in five first-class cricket matches.

He joined St Kilda in 1974 and finished that season as their leading goalkicker with 28 goals. He was their top vote getter in the 1980 Brownlow Medal and in the same year earned All-Australian selection while representing Western Australia at the Adelaide State of Origin Carnival, one of six times that he would play for them. For the second half of the 1981 season and all of 1982, Duperouzel was the Saints' captain. He crossed to Footscray in 1983 where he played a further two VFL seasons.

References

1950 births
Living people
Claremont Football Club players
Western Bulldogs players
St Kilda Football Club players
Western Australian State of Origin players
All-Australians (1953–1988)
Australian cricketers
Western Australia cricketers
Australian rules footballers from Western Australia
People from Northam, Western Australia
Cricketers from Western Australia